The 31st Annual American Music Awards were held on November 16, 2003, at the Shrine Auditorium, in Los Angeles, California. The awards recognized the most popular artists and albums from the year 2003.

Performances

Notes
  Pretaped performance.
  3rd Annual Coca-Cola New Music Award winners.

Winners and nominees

References

 http://www.rockonthenet.com/archive/2003/amas2.htm

2003
2003 music awards